St. Mary & All Saints’ Church in Dale Street, Palfrey was built in 1901 to 1902 designed by J. E. K. and J. P. Cutts of London. It replaced a former mission church built of corrugated iron in 1893 which became too small for the parishioners. The church is of red brick and consists of a chancel, a nave, a north chapel, a south chapel, an organ, and sacristy. The east window was added in 1926 as a war memorial. Due to falling attendances the Church closed for worship in 1999 and ceased as a Parish in 2002. It is now the Orthodox Church of the Nativity of the Mother of God.

The eagle lectern formerly of this Church is now relocated in the Lady Chapel at St Gabriel's Church, Walsall. The reredos are now located at St Stephen's Church, Wolverhampton. The roll of honour is still located in the building today. The stations of the cross are at the Mission Church of the Annunciation, Walsall.

Clergy

Clergy who served St Mary & All Saints, Palfrey 
1961 - 1964 Fr H. Bevan (Vicar)

1976 - 1980 Fr I. Gregory (Priest in Charge)

1980 - 1987 Fr P. Bryan (Priest in Charge)

1990 - 1997 Fr N. Mpunzi (Priest in Charge)

1997 - 2002 Fr R. Miller (Priest in Charge)

Assistant Curates 
1948 - 1952 Fr A. Wolstenhulme

1952 - 1954 Fr J. Wright

1993 - 1997 Fr R. Miller

1997 - 2002 Fr T. R. H. Coyne

References 

 http://www.historywebsite.co.uk/articles/Walsall/religion2.htm
 https://www.facebook.com/benefice.stmartin.ststephen/photos/pcb.1552956534733015/1552956268066375/?type=3&theater

Walsall
Anglo-Catholic church buildings in the West Midlands (county)